The 2004 Giro d'Italia was the 87th edition of the Giro d'Italia, one of cycling's Grand Tours. The field consisted of 169 riders, and 140 riders finished the race.

By rider

By nationality

References

2004 Giro d'Italia
2004